Szarvaskő is a village in Heves County, Northern Hungary Region, Hungary.

Geography

The village is located on the western border of the Bükk Mountains.  Because of the picturesque landscape the village is on the path of the National Blue Trail.

Communications
Szarvaskő is on the Road 25 between Eger and Tarnalelesz. 
The Eger-Putnok railway line passes through the village, and there are 2 trains per day at the Szarvaskő railway station.

Sights to visit

 Szarvaskő Castle Ruin
 Major-tetői kilátó (Major Lookout)
 Roman Catholic church 
 Öko-Park Panzió-Kemping és Kalandpark (English: leisure-camping and adventure park)

Gallery

References

External links

  in Hungarian
 Szarvaskő 

Populated places in Heves County